In psychological theories of motivation, the Rubicon model, more completely the Rubicon model of action phases, makes a distinction between motivational and volitional processes. The Rubicon model "defines clear boundaries between motivational and action phases". The first boundary "separates the motivational process of the predecisional phase from the volitional processes of postdecisional phase."  Another boundary is that between initiation and conclusion of an action. A self-regulatory feedback model incorporating these interfaces was proposed later by others, as illustrated in the figure.

The name "Rubicon model" derives from the tale of Caesar's crossing the Rubicon River, a point of no return, thereby revealing his intentions. According to the Rubicon model, every action includes such a point of no return at which the individual moves from goal setting to goal striving.
"Once subjects move from planning and goal-setting to the implementation of plans, they cross a metaphorical Rubicon. That is, their goals are typically protected and fostered by self-regulatory activity rather than reconsidered or changed, often even when challenged."
— Lyn Corno, The best laid plans, p. 15 (quoted by Rauber)

The Rubicon model addresses four questions, as identified by Achtziger and Gollwitzer:
How do people select their goals?
How do they plan the execution of their goals?
How do they enact their plans?
How do they evaluate their efforts to accomplish a specific goal?

The study of these issues is undertaken by both the fields of cognitive neuroscience and social psychology. A possible connection between these approaches is brain imaging work attempting to relate volition to neuroanatomy.

Background
Human action coordinates such aspects of human behavior as perception, thought, emotion, and skills to classify goals as attainable or unattainable and then to engage or disengage in trying to attain these goals. According to Heckhausen & Heckhausen, "Research based on the Rubicon model of action phases has provided a wealth of empirical evidence for mental and behavioral resources being orchestrated in this manner." Engagement and disengagement with goals affects personal distress over the unachievable. "By having new goals available, and reengaging in those new goals, a person can reduce distress....while continuing to derive a sense of purpose in life by finding other pursuits of value."

See also
Cognitive psychology
Executive functions
Delayed gratification
Motivation
Self-control
Self-efficacy
Self-regulated learning
Self-regulation theory

References

Autonomy
Decision theory
Free will
Motivation
Planning